Colaspis is a genus of leaf beetles in the subfamily Eumolpinae. It is one of the largest genera in the subfamily, containing over 200 species, and it is known from both North and South America. A number of species from this genus are considered to be pests, such as the grape colaspis (Colaspis brunnea). Some species are known from the fossil record from the Eocene of Colorado in the United States.

Taxonomy
In some publications for the Neotropical realm, Colaspis is also known as Maecolaspis. This alternative name was created by the Czech entomologist Jan Bechyné in 1950, due to an error relating to the type species of Colaspis: Bechyné incorrectly considered Colaspis testacea to be the type species of Colaspis, rather than Chrysomela flavicornis. As a result, Metaxyonycha, which shared the same type species, was synonymised with Colaspis. The species of Colaspis in the Junk-Schenkling catalog were then placed under Bechyné's new name, "Maecolaspis", with Chrysomela flavicornis as the type species. These errors were corrected by W. J. Brown in 1961, who synonymized Maecolaspis with Colaspis. Despite this, Bechyné continued to use Maecolaspis as valid, while Doris Holmes Blake published several papers on Colaspis without mentioning Bechyné's Maecolaspis. This effectively created two systems for the taxonomy of the Neotropical leaf beetles, which has frequently confused those studying the Neotropical Eumolpinae.

Many species originally placed in Colaspis were split by Bechyné into several smaller genera, such as Allocolaspis, Callicolaspis, Percolaspis, Nodocolaspis and Zenocolaspis. The genus requires further subdivision.

Species
These extant species belong to the genus Colaspis (= Maecolaspis):

 Colaspis abdominalis Lefèvre, 1877
 Colaspis aberrans (Bechyné, 1953)
 Colaspis achardi Bechyné, 1949
 Colaspis achardi achardi Bechyné, 1949
 Colaspis achardi pseudoachardi (Bechyné, 1950)
 Colaspis adducta Clavareau, 1914
 Colaspis adusta Lefèvre, 1885
 Colaspis aenea Fabricius, 1801
 Colaspis aeneicollis Bowditch, 1921
 Colaspis aeneola Weise, 1921 g
 Colaspis aeneola aeneola Weise, 1921
 Colaspis aeneola barticensis (Bechyné, 1951)
 Colaspis aerea Lefèvre, 1884 g
 Colaspis aerea aerea Lefèvre, 1884
 Colaspis aerea odetta (Bechyné, 1953)
 Colaspis aeruginosa (Germar, 1824)
 Colaspis aeruginosa aeruginosa (Germar, 1824)
 Colaspis aeruginosa tenuesculpta (Bechyné, 1950)
 Colaspis affinis Weise, 1921
 Colaspis alcyonea Suffrian, 1866
 Colaspis amabilis Jacoby, 1900
 Colaspis amazonae Jacoby, 1900
 Colaspis amplicollis Blake, 1971
 Colaspis anceps Lefèvre, 1878
 Colaspis ansa Riley, 2020
 Colaspis apurensis (Bechyné, 1951)
 Colaspis araguensis (Bechyné, 1958)
 Colaspis arizonensis Schaeffer, 1933 i c g b
 Colaspis assimilis Klug, 1829
 Colaspis balyi Jacoby, 1881
 Colaspis barberi Blake, 1967
 Colaspis basipennis Bowditch, 1921
 Colaspis batesi Jacoby, 1900
 Colaspis bicolor Germar, 1824
 Colaspis bidenticollis Bowditch, 1921
 Colaspis blakeae Ostmark, 1975
 Colaspis bohumilae (Bechyné, 1950)
 Colaspis braxatibiae Blake, 1978
 Colaspis bridarollii Bechyné, 1949
 Colaspis brownsvillensis Blake, 1976 i c g b (Brownsville milkvine leaf beetle)
 Colaspis brunnea (Fabricius, 1798) i c g b (grape colaspis)
 Colaspis brunneipennis Bowditch, 1921
 Colaspis buckleyi (Bechyné, 1953)
 Colaspis buckleyi buckleyi (Bechyné, 1953)
 Colaspis buckleyi incomparabilis (Bechyné, 1950)
 Colaspis calcarifera (Bechyné, 1954)
 Colaspis caligula Agrain, Cabrera, Holgado & Vicchi, 2016
 Colaspis callichloris Lefèvre, 1878
 Colaspis carolinensis Blake, 1974 i c g
 Colaspis castanea Boheman, 1858
 Colaspis championi Jacoby, 1881 i c g
 Colaspis chapalensis Blake, 1976
 Colaspis chapuisi Jacoby, 1884
 Colaspis chlorana Lefèvre, 1891
 Colaspis chlorites Erichson, 1847
 Colaspis chloropsis Blake, 1976
 Colaspis coelestina Erichson, 1847
 Colaspis concolor Bowditch, 1921 g
 Colaspis confusa Bowditch, 1921
 Colaspis corrugata Lefèvre, 1885
 Colaspis corumbensis Blake, 1978
 Colaspis costipennis Crotch, 1873 i c g b
 Colaspis cribellata Lefèvre, 1888
 Colaspis cribricollis Lefèvre, 1884
 Colaspis cribricollis cribricollis Lefèvre, 1884
 Colaspis cribricollis machacalisa (Bechyné, 1958)
 Colaspis crinicornis Schaeffer, 1933 i c g b
 Colaspis cruriflava Blake, 1977 i c g b
 Colaspis cubensis Blake, 1967
 Colaspis darlingtoni Blake, 1967
 Colaspis dejeani Lefèvre, 1884 g
 Colaspis deleta Suffrian, 1867
 Colaspis delphina (Bechyné, 1951)
 Colaspis demersa (Bechyné, 1950)
 Colaspis dentifera (Bechyné, 1951)
 Colaspis dentipyga (Bechyné, 1958)
 Colaspis diduma Blake, 1976
 Colaspis dilatipes Bowditch, 1921
 Colaspis dionysea Bechyné, 1949
 Colaspis discolor Weise, 1921
 Colaspis dispar Bowditch, 1921
 Colaspis diversa Lefèvre, 1878
 Colaspis dugesi Lefèvre, 1885
 Colaspis ekraspedona Blake, 1978
 Colaspis exarata Lefèvre, 1884
 Colaspis farri Blake, 1967
 Colaspis favosa Say, 1824 i c g b
 Colaspis femoralis Olivier, 1808
 Colaspis fervida (Suffrian, 1866)
 Colaspis flavantenna Blake, 1978
 Colaspis flavicornis (Fabricius, 1787)
 Colaspis flavicornis flavicornis (Fabricius, 1787)
 Colaspis flavicornis pedator (Bechyné, 1950)
 Colaspis flavicornis urbana  (Bechyné, 1950)
 Colaspis flavipes Olivier, 1808
 Colaspis flavocostata Schaeffer, 1933 i c g b
 Colaspis floridana Schaeffer, 1933 i c g
 Colaspis foersteri (Bechyné, 1958)
 Colaspis foveicollis Jacoby, 1880
 Colaspis freyi Bechyné, 1950
 Colaspis freyi adscripta (Bechyné, 1953)
 Colaspis freyi freyi  Bechyné, 1950
 Colaspis fulvilabris Jacoby, 1880
 Colaspis fulvotestacea Lefèvre, 1878
 Colaspis fuscipes Bowditch, 1921
 Colaspis gemellata Lefèvre, 1885
 Colaspis gemmingeri Harold, 1874
 Colaspis gemmingeri chaparensis (Bechyné, 1951)
 Colaspis gemmingeri gemmingeri Harold, 1874
 Colaspis gemmula Erichson, 1847
 Colaspis geniculata Lefèvre, 1891
 Colaspis goyazensis Bowditch, 1921
 Colaspis guatemalensis Blake, 1976
 Colaspis gwendolina (Bechyné, 1953)
 Colaspis hesperia Blake, 1974 i c g b
 Colaspis heteroclita Jacoby, 1900
 Colaspis hirticornis (Bechyné, 1955)
 Colaspis hypochlora Lefèvre, 1878
 Colaspis hypochlora anteposita (Bechyné, 1950)
 Colaspis hypochlora hypochlora Lefèvre, 1878
 Colaspis impressipennis Bowditch, 1921
 Colaspis inconspicua Jacoby, 1890
 Colaspis interstitialis Lefèvre, 1877
 Colaspis intricata Lefèvre, 1888
 Colaspis jalapae (Bechyné, 1950)
 Colaspis jansoni Jacoby, 1881
 Colaspis janssensi (Bechyné, 1950)
 Colaspis jocosa Bowditch, 1921
 Colaspis joliveti (Bechyné, 1950)
 Colaspis juxaoculus Blake, 1978
 Colaspis kaszabi (Bechyné, 1953)
 Colaspis keyensis Blake, 1974 i c g
 Colaspis kirra Blake, 1976
 Colaspis klagii Bowditch, 1921
 Colaspis labilis (Bechyné, 1953)
 Colaspis lampomela Blake, 1978
 Colaspis laplatensis Bechyné, 1949
 Colaspis lata Schaeffer, 1933 i c g
 Colaspis lauei (Bechyné, 1950)
 Colaspis lebasi Lefèvre, 1878
 Colaspis lebasi falconensis (Bechyné, 1997)
 Colaspis lebasi gwendolina (Bechyné, 1953)
 Colaspis lebasi lebasi Lefèvre, 1878
 Colaspis lebasi praecipitata (Bechyné, 1997)
 Colaspis lebasi ruderalis (Bechyné, 1997)
 Colaspis lebasiformis (Bechyné, 1953)
 Colaspis lebasoides Bowditch, 1921
 Colaspis legionalis (Bechyné, 1953) g
 Colaspis legionalis bubonica (Bechyné, 1997)
 Colaspis legionalis dispersa (Bechyné, 1997)
 Colaspis legionalis legionalis (Bechyné, 1953)
 Colaspis leopoldina (Bechyné, 1954)
 Colaspis leucopus Harold, 1875
 Colaspis levicostata Blake, 1976
 Colaspis libatrix (Bechyné, 1953)
 Colaspis longipennis Blake, 1976
 Colaspis lophodes Blake, 1974
 Colaspis louisianae Blake, 1974 i c g b
 Colaspis luciae Blake, 1967
 Colaspis luridula Lefèvre, 1878
 Colaspis luteicornis (Fabricius, 1792)
 Colaspis lutescens Lefèvre, 1886
 Colaspis macroptera Blake, 1976
 Colaspis maida (Bechyné, 1954)
 Colaspis manausa Blake, 1978
 Colaspis melaina Blake, 1974 i c g
 Colaspis melancholica Jacoby, 1881
 Colaspis meriamae (Bechyné, 1951)
 Colaspis metallica Lefèvre, 1891 g
 Colaspis mexicana Jacoby, 1881
 Colaspis micans Weise, 1921
 Colaspis minuta Lefèvre, 1891
 Colaspis missionea Bechyné, 1949
 Colaspis mixticolor (Bechyné, 1951)
 Colaspis moesta Horn, 1895
 Colaspis monomorpha (Bechyné, 1950)
 Colaspis monrosi (Bechyné, 1950)
 Colaspis montana Jacoby, 1891
 Colaspis musae Bechyné, 1950 g
 Colaspis nigricornis Fabricius, 1801
 Colaspis nigripennis Jacoby, 1880
 Colaspis nigrocyanea Crotch, 1873 i c g b
 Colaspis notaticornis Lefèvre, 1877
 Colaspis obliqua Bowditch, 1921
 Colaspis obscura Fabricius, 1801
 Colaspis occidentalis (Linnaeus, 1758) g
 Colaspis orientalis Blake, 1967
 Colaspis otileensis Bowditch, 1921
 Colaspis pallipes Lefèvre, 1877
 Colaspis pantaria (Bechyné, 1951)
 Colaspis pantaria emarginator (Bechyné, 1951)
 Colaspis pantaria guayanensis (Bechyné, 1997)
 Colaspis pantaria pantaria (Bechyné, 1951)
 Colaspis pantaria vaticina (Bechyné, 1997)
 Colaspis panzoensis (Bechyné, 1951)
 Colaspis paracostata Blake, 1978
 Colaspis perfidia (Bechyné, 1954)
 Colaspis perichrysea (Bechyné, 1951)
 Colaspis perturbata Weise, 1921 g
 Colaspis perturbata antanossa (Bechyné, 1950)
 Colaspis perturbata coloresignata (Bechyné, 1951)
 Colaspis perturbata ostrina (Bechyné, 1950)
 Colaspis perturbata perturbata Weise, 1921
 Colaspis perturbata phylis (Bechyné, 1953)
 Colaspis pini Barber, 1937 i c g b (pine colaspis)
 Colaspis planicostata Blake, 1974 i c g b
 Colaspis pleuralis Weise, 1921
 Colaspis plicatula Jacoby, 1882
 Colaspis pohli (Bechyné, 1955)
 Colaspis pohli major (Bechyné, 1958)
 Colaspis pohli pohli (Bechyné, 1955)
 Colaspis propinqua Lefèvre, 1885
 Colaspis prospectans (Bechyné, 1958)
 Colaspis proteus Bechyné, 1949
 Colaspis pseudofavosa E. Riley, 1978 i c g b
 Colaspis pseudogeminata (Bechyné, 1950)
 Colaspis pseudopruinosa Bechyné, 1949
 Colaspis pubiceps (Bechyné, 1952)
 Colaspis punctigera Weise, 1921
 Colaspis punctipennis Bowditch, 1921
 Colaspis purpurala Blake, 1978
 Colaspis purpurea Blake, 1971
 Colaspis quattuordecimcostata Lefèvre, 1877
 Colaspis recurva Blake, 1974 i c g b
 Colaspis reflexomicans (Bechyné, 1953)
 Colaspis romani Weise, 1921
 Colaspis rufipes Jacoby, 1900
 Colaspis rugifera Weise, 1921
 Colaspis rugulosa Lefèvre, 1891
 Colaspis rustica Boheman, 1859
 Colaspis rustica distortella (Bechyné, 1952)
 Colaspis rustica rustica Boheman, 1859
 Colaspis rustica santoamarensis (Bechyné, 1950)
 Colaspis rustica thoracophora (Bechyné, 1952)
 Colaspis sanguinea Blake, 1977 i c g
 Colaspis sanjoseana (Bechyné, 1950)
 Colaspis scintillifera Bechyné, 1949
 Colaspis scintillifera ascintillans (Bechyné, 1950)
 Colaspis scintillifera scintillifera Bechyné, 1949
 Colaspis shuteae Blake, 1976
 Colaspis similaris Blake, 1976
 Colaspis similis Blake, 1977 i c g
 Colaspis simplex Weise, 1921
 Colaspis simplicipes Bechyné, 1950
 Colaspis skelleyi Riley, 2020
 Colaspis smaragdula Olivier, 1808
 Colaspis soror Weise, 1921
 Colaspis speciosa Lefèvre, 1885
 Colaspis spinigera Blake, 1976
 Colaspis stenorachis Blake, 1976
 Colaspis strigata Lefèvre, 1878
 Colaspis subacuta (Bechyné, 1950)
 Colaspis submersa Bechyné, 1949
 Colaspis suffriani Weise, 1914
 Colaspis suggona Blake, 1977 i c g b
 Colaspis suilla Fabricius, 1801 i c g b
 Colaspis sulphuripes Lefèvre, 1877
 Colaspis sulphuripes matura (Bechyné, 1951)
 Colaspis sulphuripes sulphuripes Lefèvre, 1877
 Colaspis surrubrensis (Bechyné, 1950)
 Colaspis tabacilla (Bechyné, 1951)
 Colaspis tabacilla berriensis (Bechyné, 1951)
 Colaspis tabacilla puertocabellensis (Bechyné, 1953)
 Colaspis tabacilla sedula (Bechyné, 1951)
 Colaspis tabacilla tabacilla (Bechyné, 1951)
 Colaspis taylori Bechyné, 1949
 Colaspis thomasi Riley, 2020
 Colaspis tibialis Lefèvre, 1885
 Colaspis townsendi Bowditch, 1921
 Colaspis trichopyga (Bechyné, 1954)
 Colaspis trichopyga gravida (Bechyné, 1955)
 Colaspis trichopyga trichopyga (Bechyné, 1954)
 Colaspis tucumanensis Bowditch, 1921
 Colaspis unicolor Olivier, 1808
 Colaspis utinga (Bechyné & Bechyné, 1961)
 Colaspis variabilis Blake, 1976
 Colaspis vieta (Bechyné, 1950)
 Colaspis violetta Bechyné, 1949
 Colaspis viridiceps Schaeffer, 1933 i c g b
 Colaspis viridicollis Bowditch, 1921
 Colaspis viridipunctata Jacoby, 1900
 Colaspis viridissima Lefèvre, 1877
 Colaspis viriditincta Schaeffer, 1919 i c g b
 Colaspis virulenta (Bechyné, 1953)
 Colaspis willincki (Bechyné, 1950)
 Colaspis yucatana Jacoby, 1890
 Colaspis yungarum (Bechyné, 1951)
 Colaspis zanthophaia Blake, 1976
 Colaspis zilchi (Bechyné, 1954)
 Colaspis zischkai (Bechyné, 1951)

These four extinct species belong to the genus Colaspis:
 †Colaspis aetatis Wickham, 1911
 †Colaspis diluvialis Wickham, 1914
 †Colaspis luti Scudder, 1900
 †Colaspis proserpina Wickham, 1914

Synonyms:
 Colaspis aemula Weise, 1921: synonym of Colaspis flavipes Olivier, 1808
 Colaspis cartwrighti Blake, 1977: synonym of Tymnes tricolor (Fabricius, 1792)
 Colaspis coneja Kolbe, 1901: synonym of Nodocolaspis columbica (Jacoby, 1900)
 Colaspis costipennis Lefèvre, 1877: renamed to Colaspis lophodes Blake, 1974
 Colaspis elegans Jacoby, 1900: synonym of Nodocolaspis costipennis (Lefèvre, 1877)
 Colaspis flavipes (Fabricius, 1781): synonym of Colaspis occidentalis (Linnaeus, 1758)
 Colaspis pectoralis Lefèvre, 1885: synonym of Coytiera (Campylochira) zikani Bechyné, 1950
 Colaspis prasina Lefèvre, 1878: synonym of Colaspis flavicornis (Fabricius, 1787)

Data sources: i = ITIS, c = Catalogue of Life, g = GBIF, b = Bugguide.net

References

External links 
 
 
 
 
 Colaspis at insectoid.info

Chrysomelidae genera
Eumolpinae
Beetles of North America
Beetles of South America
Taxa named by Johan Christian Fabricius
Eocene insects
Prehistoric insects of North America